Azlaf (Tarifit: Azřaf, ⴰⵣⵍⴰⴼ; Arabic:  ازلاف) is a commune in Driouch Province of the Oriental administrative region of Morocco. At the time of the 2004 census, the commune had a total population of 5337 people living in 1004 households.

References

Populated places in Driouch Province
Rural communes of Oriental (Morocco)